Oil City is a small unincorporated community in Carter County, Oklahoma, United States, located approximately 17 miles northwest of Ardmore. The community was established in 1896.

It was originally named Wheeler, but the name of its post office was officially changed on October 15, 1919. The post office closed in 1930.

References

Unincorporated communities in Carter County, Oklahoma
Unincorporated communities in Oklahoma